Miss Universo Chile or Miss Chile is a national beauty pageant that selects Chile's representative to the Miss Universe pageant.

History
Chile is one of the few countries that has participated in Miss Universe since 1952, has sent 53 representatives in the pageant's 65-year history and placed 13 times in the Semi-Finals, with one Miss Universe crown: Cecilia Bolocco, in 1987.

Luciano Marocchino had the Chilean franchise for Miss Universe since 2004, but did not send a delegate on 2007-2010 period. In 2011, Chile returned to the competition with Vanessa Ceruti, Miss Universo Chile 2011. 

Marocchino's organization received many negative critics, due to the less preparation given to the winners. He gave up the contest in 2015.

The national broadcaster, Chilevisión held the contest from 2016 up to 2018.

In 2019 Keno Manzur took over the Miss Universe franchise in Chile as National Director.

The current titleholder is Sofia Depassier, she will represent her country in the upcoming Miss Universe 2022 on a date to be announced.

Titleholders

The winner of Miss Chile represents her country at the Miss Universe. On occasion, when the winner does not qualify (due to age) a runner-up is sent.

See also
Miss World Chile

References

External links
 Official Miss Universo Chile website

 
Beauty pageants in Chile
1952 establishments in Chile
Chilean awards
Chile